Iowa Highway 110 (Iowa 110) is a north–south state highway in northwestern Iowa. Iowa 110 begins at U.S. Highway 20 (US 20) south of Schaller and ends in Storm Lake at Iowa Highway 7.

Route description
It heads north through Schaller and through northwest Sac County, crossing into Buena Vista County near mile marker 6. Three miles into Buena Vista County, Iowa 110 turns to the east at Buena Vista County Road C65 (CR C65). For , the route heads east, turning to the north again near the southwestern shore of Storm Lake. The highway ends at Iowa Highway 7 on the extreme western side of the city.

History
Iowa Highway 110 was designated in 1934 on an old segment of Primary Road No. 4.  Through the city of Storm Lake, the route followed the northern shore of Storm Lake; it ended at U.S. Highway 71 in the downtown area.  By 1952, only the segment from U.S. Highway 20 to Schaller was paved.  By 1956, the entire route was paved.  By 1970, Iowa 110 was rerouted away from the downtown area to its current western end.

Major intersections

References

External links

End of Iowa 110 at Iowa Highway Ends

110